The Police War (French: La guerre des polices) is a French police drama film directed by Robin Davis and starring Claude Brasseur, Claude Rich and Marlène Jobert. The French title (literally: "the war of the polices") refers to the rivalry between the two divisions of the French police force: the Territorial Brigade and the Anti-Gang Brigade.

Plot
The team of Commissaire Ballestrat from the Territorial Brigade stakes out the hideout of a dangerous criminal named Sarlat. Suddenly, Commissaire Fush and his team from the Anti-Gang Brigade arrive to the site. The ambitious Ballestrat would rather let Sarlat escape than allow the rival team to take credit for the arrest. In the ensuing shootout, Sarlat kills one of Fush's men and flees. From then on, the two teams treat each other with open hostility. The police chief orders Ballestrat to cooperate with the Anti-Gang team. But the two groups would still act separately in their pursuit of Sarlat. Fush becomes close with Marie, one of Ballestrat's team members. She later betrays him by informing her boss of the Anti-Gang's upcoming operation to capture Sarlat's accomplice Manekian. Ballestrat's interference causes a death of an innocent bystander. Fush submits his resignation. Then the massive police ambush against Sarlat misfires, and one of the officers is taken hostage. While the rest of the police prefer to wait the situation out, Fush single-handedly confronts Sarlat, and they are both killed in the resulting stand-off.

Cast

 Claude Brasseur : Jacques Fush
 Claude Rich : Ballestrat
 Gérard Desarthe : Hector Sarlat
 Marlène Jobert : Marie Garcin
 Jean-François Stévenin : Capati
 Georges Staquet : Millard
 Étienne Chicot : Larue
 Jean-Pierre Kalfon : Marc
 Rufus : Le Garrec
 Féodor Atkine : Serge Manékian
 François Périer : Police Chief Colombani
 Ludmila Mikaël : The Magistrate
 David Jalil : Djalloud
 Jean Rougerie : Mermoz
 Jacques Lalande : Pralin
 Roger Miremont : Lagrange
 Franck-Olivier Bonnet : René
 Albert Dray : Francis
 Jacqueline Parent
 Michel Berto

Reception
The film had 1,792,679 admissions in France and ranked 18th at the 1979 box-office.

Awards
Claude Brasseur won the César Award for Best Actor at the 1980 César Awards.

References

External links
 

1979 films
1979 crime drama films
French crime drama films
Films directed by Robin Davis
1970s French films